Crambinae is a large subfamily of the lepidopteran family Crambidae, the crambid snout moths. It currently includes over 1,800 species worldwide. The larvae are root feeders or stem borers, mostly on grasses. A few species are pests of sod grasses, maize, sugar cane, rice, and other Poaceae. The monophyly of this group is supported by the structure of the tympanal organs and the phallus attached medially to the juxta, as well as genetic analyses.

Taxonomists' opinions differ as to the correct placement of the Crambidae, some authorities treating them as a subfamily of the family Pyralidae. If this is done, the present group would be demoted to tribe status, as Crambini.

Crambinae taxonomy
tribe incertae sedis
Anaclastis Turner, 1904
Aphrophantis Meyrick, 1933
Argentochiloides Błeszyński, 1961 (= Argentochilo Błeszyński & Collins, 1962)
Australargyria Błeszyński, 1970
Autarotis Meyrick, 1886 (= Pogonoptera Turner, 1911)
Batiana Walker, 1866
Burmannia Bleszynski, 1965 
Catancyla Hampson, 1919
Catharylla Zeller, 1863
Charltona Swinhoe, 1886
Charltoniada Strand, 1918
Conocrambus Hampson, 1919 (= Anaresca Turner, 1947)
Corynophora Berg, 1898 (= Halterophora Meyrick, 1897)
Cypholomia Meyrick, 1933
Diadexia Turner, 1905
Diploptalis Hampson, 1919 (= Diplotalis Błeszyński, 1963)
Diploschistis Meyrick, 1937
Elethyia Ragonot in de Joannis & Ragonot, 1889
Epina Walker, 1866 (= Diatraenopsis Dyar & Heinrich, 1927)
Eurhythma Turner, 1904 (= Eurythma Błeszyński & Collins, 1962)
Hemiplatytes Barnes & Benjamin, 1924 (= Alamogordia Dyar & Heinrich, 1927)
Hemiptocha Dognin, 1905
Idioblasta Warren, 1891
Japonichilo Okano, 1962
Kupea Philpott, 1930
Libuna Moore, 1886 (= Bulina Walker, 1866)
Lyndia Savigny, 1816
Maoricrambus Gaskin, 1975
Mestolobes Butler, 1882 (= Promylaea Meyrick, 1899)
Metaeuchromius Błeszyński, 1960 (= Pseudeuchromius Błeszyński, 1965)
Micrelephas Dognin, 1905
Microchilo Okano, 1962
Micronix Amsel, 1956
Microtalis Turner, 1911
Neargyria Hampson, 1896
Neargyrioides Błeszyński, 1970
Nechilo Błeszyński, 1970
Neobanepa Hampson, 1919 (= Pyralopsis Dognin, 1905)
Niveocatharylla Bassi, 1999
Orthomecyna Butler, 1883
Parancyla Hampson, 1919
Paratraea Hampson, 1919
Parerupa Hampson, 1919 (= Coenotalis Hampson, 1919)
Protyparcha Meyrick, 1909
Pseudargyria Okano, 1962
Pseudometachilo Błeszyński, 1962
Ptochostola Meyrick, 1882
Roxita Błeszyński, 1963 (= Modestia Błeszyński, 1965)
Schoenobiodes Hampson, 1917 (= Stenopydna Roepke, 1943)
Sphaerodeltis Meyrick, 1933
Styxon Błeszyński, 1962
Thalamarchis Meyrick, 1897
Tomissa Walker, 1864
Tulla Zimmerman, 1958
Ubida Walker, 1863 (= Crunophila Meyrick, 1882)
Zacatecas Błeszyński, 1962
tribe Ancylolomiini Ragonot, 1889
Ancylolomia Hübner, 1825 (= Acylolomia Hampson, 1919, Jartheza Walker, 1863, Pseudoctenella Strand, 1907, Ctenus Mabille, 1906, Tollia Amsel, 1949)
Aurotalis Błeszyński, 1970
Eufernaldia Hulst, 1900
Mesolia Ragonot in de Joannis & Ragonot, 1889 (= Deuterolia Dyar, 1914, Eugrotea Fernald, 1896, Euparolia Dyar, 1914, Masolia Hampson, 1919)
Prionapteron Błeszyński, 1965
Prionapteryx Stephens, 1834 (= Alloea Turner, 1947, Calarina Walker, 1866, Hypotomorpha Rebel, 1892, Nuarace Walker, 1863, Naurace Błeszyński & Collins, 1962, Pindicitora Walker, 1863, Pindicitra Shibuya, 1928, Platytesia Strand, 1918, Prionopteryx Zeller, 1863)
Prionotalis Hampson, 1919
Pseudoschoenobius Fernald, 1891
Surattha Walker, 1863
Talis Guenée, 1845 (= Drasa Kapur, 1950, Prosmixis Zeller, 1846, Tulis Pagenstecher, 1909)
Zovax Błeszyński, 1962
tribe Argyriini Munroe, 1995
Argyria Hübner, 1818
Urola Walker, 1863
Vaxi Błeszyński, 1962
tribe Calamotrophini Gaskin, 1988
Calamotropha Zeller, 1863 (= Aurelianus Błeszyński, 1962, Myeza Walker, 1863)
Chrysocatharylla Bassi, 1999
Classeya Błeszyński, 1960
Pseudocatharylla Błeszyński, 1961
Pseudoclasseya Błeszyński, 1964
tribe Chiloini Heinemann, 1865
Chilandrus Błeszyński, 1970
Chilo Zincken, 1817 (= Borer Guenée, 1862, Chilona Sodoffsky, 1837, Chilotraea Kapur, 1950, Diphryx Grote, 1881, Hypiesta Hampson, 1919, Nephalia Turner, 1911, Silveria Dyar, 1925)
Chiqua Błeszyński, 1970
Diatraea Guilding, 1828 (= Crambidiatraea Box & Capps, 1955, Diaraetria Grote, 1882, Diatraerupa Schaus, 1913, Diatrea Guilding, 1828, Eodiatraea Box, 1953, Iesta Dyar, 1909, Trinidadia Dyar & Heinrich, 1927, Zeadiatraea Box, 1955)
Eschata Walker, 1856 (= Chaerecla Walker, 1865)
Gadira Walker, 1866 (= Cryptomima Meyrick, 1882, Scenoploca Meyrick, 1882)
Hednota Meyrick, 1886
Leonardo Błeszyński, 1965
Malgasochilo Błeszyński, 1970
Myelobia Herrich-Schäffer, 1854 (= Chilopsis Hampson, 1919, Doratoperas Hampson, 1896, Protaphomia Meyrick, 1936, Xanthopherne Dyar & Heinrich, 1927)
Tauroscopa Meyrick, 1888 (= Oressaula Turner, 1913)
tribe Crambini Latreille, 1810
Agriphila Hübner, 1825 (= Agrophila J. L. R. Agassiz, 1847, Alisa Ganev & Hacker, 1984)
Agriphiloides Błeszyński, 1965
Almita B. Landry, 1995
Alphacrambus Bassi, 1995
Amselia Błeszyński, 1959
Angustalius Marion, 1954 (= Bleszynskia Lattin, 1961, Crambopsis Lattin, 1952)
Arequipa Walker, 1863
Aureocramboides Błeszyński, 1961
Bassiknysna Kemal & Kocak, 2005 (= Knysna Bassi, 1999)
Caffrocrambus Błeszyński, 1961 (= Anomocrambus Błeszyński, 1961, Caffocrambus Bassi, 1994)
Catoptria Hübner, 1825 (= Exoria Hübner, 1825, Tetrachila Hübner, 1806)
Cervicrambus Błeszyński, 1966
Chrysocrambus Błeszyński, 1957 (= Chrysocramboides Błeszyński, 1957)
Chrysoteuchia Hübner, 1825 (= Amphibolia Snellen, 1884, Veronese Błeszyński, 1962)
Conocramboides Błeszyński, 1970
Crambixon Błeszyński, 1965
Crambus Fabricius, 1798 (= Argyroteuchia Hübner, 1825, Chilus Billberg, 1820, Palparia Haworth, 1811, Tetrachila Hübner, 1822)
Culladia Moore, 1886 (= Araxes Walker, 1863, Crambidion Mabille, 1900, Nirmaladia Rose, 1983)
Culladiella Błeszyński, 1970
Dimorphocrambus Gibeaux, 1987
Epichilo Ragonot in de Joannis & Ragonot, 1889
Fernandocrambus Aurivillius, 1922 (= Juania Aurivillius, 1922, Juanita Munroe, 1995)
Fissicrambus Błeszyński, 1963
Flavocrambus Błeszyński, 1959
Haplopediasia Błeszyński, 1963
Haploplatytes Błeszyński, 1966
Japonicrambus Okano, 1962
La Błeszyński, 1966
Loxocrambus Forbes, 1920
Mesocrambus Błeszyński, 1957
Mesopediasia Błeszyński, 1963
Metacrambus Błeszyński, 1957
Microcramboides Błeszyński, 1967
Microcrambon Błeszyński, 1970
Microcrambus Błeszyński, 1963
Miraxis Błeszyński, 1962
Miyakea Marumo, 1933
Neocrambus Błeszyński, 1957
Neoculladia Błeszyński, 1967
Neodactria B. Landry, 1995
Neopediasia Okano, 1962
Novocrambus Amsel, 1956
Orocrambus Purdie, 1884 (= Orocrambus Meyrick, 1885)
Parapediasia Błeszyński, 1966 (Parapediasia Błeszyński, 1963)
Paraplatytes Błeszyński, 1965
Pediasia Hübner, 1825 (= Carvanca Walker, 1856, Oseriates Fazekas, 1991, Pseudopediasia Ganev, 1987)
Platytes Guenée, 1845 (= Nagahama Marumo, 1933)
Precaffrocrambus Bassi, 2002
Productalius Marion, 1954
Pseudopediasia Błeszyński, 1963
Raphiptera Hampson, 1896
Sebrus Błeszyński, 1970
Sericocrambus Wallengren, 1861
Supercrambus Błeszyński, 1967
Tawhitia Philpott, 1931 (= Velasquez Błeszyński, 1962)
Tehama Hulst, 1888
Thaumatopsis Morrison, 1874 (= Propexus Grote, 1880)
Thisanotia Hübner, 1825 (= Thinasotia Heinemann, 1865, Thysanotia J. L. R. Agassiz, 1847)
Tortriculladia Błeszyński, 1967
Xanthocrambus Błeszyński, 1957 (= Xanthocrambus Błeszyński, 1955)
tribe Diptychophorini Gaskin, 1972
Cleoeromene Gaskin, 1986
Diptychophora Zeller, 1866 (= Colimaea Dyar, 1925, Colimea Błeszyński, 1966, Mysticomima Meyrick, 1931, Scissolia Barnes & McDunnough, 1914)
Gargela Walker, 1864 (= Mixophyla Meyrick, 1887, Angonia Snellen, 1893, Mixophila Hampson, 1896)
Glaucocharis Meyrick, 1938 (= Pagmania Amsel, 1961, Pareromene Osthelder, 1941, Ditomoptera Hampson, 1893)
Incaeromene Gaskin, 1986
Neoeromene Gaskin, 1986
Peniculimius Schouten, 1994
Steneromene Gaskin, 1986
Tamsica Zimmerman, 1958
tribe Euchromiini Léger, Landry & Nuss, 2019
Euchromius Guenée, 1845 (= Eromene Hübner, 1825, Ommatopteryx Kirby, 1897, Pseudoancylolomia Ahmad, Zaidi & Kamaluddin, 1982)
tribe Haimbachiini B. Landry, 1995
Achilo Amsel, 1957 (= Chilopsis Amsel, 1956)
Bissetia Kapur, 1950 (= Girdharia Kapur, 1950)
Coniesta Hampson, 1919
Donacoscaptes Zeller, 1877
Eoreuma Ely, 1910
Friedlanderia Agnew, 1987 (= Chiloides Amsel, 1949, Chiloides Błeszyński, 1963)
Haimbachia Dyar, 1909
Neogirdharia Song & Chen in Chen, Song & Yuan, 2004
Occidentalia Dyar & Heinrich, 1927
Pseudobissetia Błeszyński, 1959
Thopeutis Hübner, 1818 (= Cephis Ragonot in Staudinger, 1892, Hombergia de Joannis, 1910, Stenochilo Hampson, 1896, Tetrachila Hübner, 1808, Topeutis Hübner, 1825)
Xubida Schaus, 1922

Former genera
Araxates Ragonot in de Joannis & Ragonot, 1889
Charitopepla Meyrick, 1933
Neerupa Hampson, 1919
Loxophantis Meyrick, 1935
Welaka Hulst, 1888

See also
 List of crambid genera

References

 
Crambidae
Taxa named by Pierre André Latreille
Moth subfamilies